The 1902 Canadian Amateur Hockey League (CAHL) season was the fourth season of the league. Teams played an eight game schedule. The Montreal HC were the league champion with a record of six wins and two losses. After the season, Montreal HC challenged the Winnipeg Victorias for the Stanley Cup title and were victorious.

League business

Executive 
 George R. James, Montreal (President)
 A. D. Scott, Quebec (1st Vice-President)
 N. Charles Sparks, Ottawa ( 2nd Vice-President)
 Harry Trihey, Shamrocks(Secretary-Treasurer)

New fines were added for being more than 15 minutes late for a game and forfeiting.

The clubs demanded an increase in gate receipts share from 33% to 40% and a higher number of free tickets from the Montreal Arena owners, but settled for the increase in tickets only.

Source: Coleman, p. 68

Season 
The Shamrocks team, which had won the Stanley Cup only two seasons prior, was completely new. While Fred Scanlan went to Winnipeg, Harry Trihey, Arthur Farrell, Frank Wall, Frank Tansey, James McKenna and Jack Brannen all retired from competitive ice hockey. The team sank to the bottom of the standings.

Highlights 

Montreal would win the league led by their big line of Archie Hooper, Jack Marshall, Jimmy Gardner and Charlie Liffiton. The players would earn their nickname of the 'Little Men of Iron', winning the Stanley Cup in a challenge with Winnipeg. Hooper would score nine goals against the Shamrocks on January 5, on his way to winning the scoring title.

Final standing

Stanley Cup challenges

Winnipeg vs. Montreal 

After the Montreal HC won the 1902 CAHL title in March, they promptly sent a challenge to the Winnipeg Victorias. In game one of the best-of-three series, Winnipeg shut out Montreal, 1–0. However, Montreal shut out Winnipeg in game two, 5–0, and then held on to a 2–1 victory in game three. With the victory, the Montreal club won the Cup for the first time since 1894.

Jack Marshall of Montreal, who had played for the Winnipeg team in the previous year, faced his old team and scored three goals, including the series clincher. Archie Hooper also scored three for Montreal.

Exhibitions 
The Ottawa Hockey Club travelled to New York after the season for an exhibition series. Ottawa defeated the Hockey Club of New York 4–3 on March 21, 1902. Ottawa lost to the New York Athletic Club 6–3 on March 23. Both games were at the St. Nicholas Rink.

Schedule and results 

† Montreal HC clinches league championship.

Player statistics

Goaltending averages 
Note: GP = Games played, GA = Goals against, SO = Shutouts, GAA = Goals against average

Scoring leaders

Stanley Cup engraving

1902 Montreal Hockey Club
,

See also 
 List of Stanley Cup champions

References

Bibliography

Notes

Canadian Amateur Hockey League seasons
CAHL